Barry McGoldrick (born 29 April 1985) is an Irish Gaelic footballer who plays for the Derry county team, with whom he has won a National League title. He is also the current team captain. At underage level he won the Ulster Minor and All-Ireland Minor Championships with the county.

McGoldrick plays club football for Eoghan Rua and has won the Derry Senior Football Championship with the club. He is a dual player in that he also plays hurling for Eoghan Rua, and has in the past also hurled for Derry, winning the Nicky Rackard Cup.

Early and family life
McGoldrick is from Portstewart, County Londonderry, Northern Ireland. His father Sean played for Antrim. His brother Sean Leo has also played football and hurling for Derry. His brother Ciaran and cousin Niall Holly are also part of the Derry panel and youngest brother Colm part of the under-21 panel. His sisters play camogie for Derry. His sister Grainne was nominated for Camogie All Stars in both 2006 and 2008.

Football career

Inter-county
McGoldrick was part of the Derry Minor side that won the 2002 Ulster Minor Championship and All-Ireland Minor Championship. He was a member of the Derry Under-21 team that finished runners-up to Tyrone in the 2006 Ulster Under-21 Football Championship.

McGoldrick was called up to the Derry Senior football panel in November 2005 for the 2006 season. He started in Derry's opening 2006 Championship games against Tyrone and Donegal, but missed the Kildare and Longford games due to a broken hand. He had an injury hit season in 2007, but came back strongly in 2008 starting all Derry's National League games. He was part of the Derry team that won the 2008 National League where Derry beat Kerry in the final.

McGoldrick and Derry also reached the National League final in 2009, but were defeated by Kerry. He missed the final due to injury. In that campaign he mostly played at centre half back, as opposed to his usual role in the forward line and has remained as a defender ever since. He has been named as the Derry captain for the 2011 season by new manager John Brennan.

Championship games
Score column lists Derry's score first.

Indicates substitute appearance.

Club
McGoldrick was instrumental in the Eoghan Rua side that won both the 2006 Derry Intermediate and Ulster Intermediate Championships, before losing out in the 2007 All-Ireland Intermediate Club Championship final to Ardfert of Kerry. He was an important member of the Eoghan Rua team which won the 2010 Derry Senior Football Championship, beating favourites Ballinderry in the final.

School/college
McGoldrick attended Loreto College in Coleraine, and captained the school to the McLarnon Cup semi-final in 2003. McGoldirck attends St. Mary's University College in Belfast and plays football for the college. He won the CAU Indoor 7s Competition with St Mary's in 2008.

International
McGoldrick represented Ireland in the Under-17 International Rules Series in 2002.

Hurling career

Inter-county
McGoldrick was part of the Derry minor hurling sides that lost out to Antrim in both the 2002 and 2003 Ulster Minor Hurling Championship finals.

His first taste of senior inter-county action came when he was 18, with the Derry hurling team, when Sean "Roe" McCloskey was manager. He was part of the Derry Senior team that won the 2006 Nicky Rackard Cup, but missed playing in the final due to a hand injury. He no longer hurls with Derry; now concentrating on football.

Club
McGoldrick won both the Derry Intermediate Hurling Championship and Derry Junior Hurling Championship with Eoghan Rua in 2006.

Honours

Country
Under 17 International Rules Series:
Winner (1): 2002

Inter-county

Senior
National Football League:
Winner (1): 2008
Runner-up: 2009
Nicky Rackard Cup:
Winner (1): 2006

Under 21
Ulster Under-21 Football Championship:
Runner up: 2004??, 2006

Minor
All-Ireland Minor Football Championship:
Winner (1): 2002
Ulster Minor Football Championship:
Winner (1): 2002
Ulster Minor Hurling Championship:
Runner up: 2002, 2003

Club
Derry Senior Football Championship:
Winner (1): 2010
All-Ireland Intermediate Club Football Championship:
Runner up: 2007
Ulster Intermediate Club Football Championship:
Winner (1): 2006
Derry Intermediate Football Championship:
Winner (1): 2006
Runner up: 2005
Derry Intermediate Hurling Championship:
Winner (at least 1): 2006, more?
Derry Junior Hurling Championship:
Winner (at least 1): 2006, more?
Underage competitions

School/college
CAU Indoor 7s Competition:
Winner (1): 2008

Note: The above lists may be incomplete. Please add any other honours you know of.

References

External links
Barry McGoldick's stats on Hurling Stats1
Player profiles on Official Derry GAA website
Stats pre-2004 not yet available. Ulster Hurling Championship only.

1985 births
Living people
Derry inter-county Gaelic footballers
Derry inter-county hurlers
Dual players
Eoghan Rua (Derry) Gaelic footballers
Eoghan Rua (Derry) hurlers
People educated at Loreto College, Coleraine
People from Portstewart